Ozro John Dodds (March 22, 1840 – April 18, 1882) was an American lawyer and Civil War veteran who briefly served as a U.S. Representative from Ohio from 1872 to 1873.

Early life, education and career
Born in Cincinnati, Ohio, Dodds attended the common schools, and Miami University, Oxford, Ohio, for four years.

Civil War
At the outbreak of the Civil War, he organized Captain Dodd's Miami University company and enlisted on April 18, 1861, as captain of Company B, Twentieth Ohio Volunteer Regiment.
He served as captain of Company F, Eighty-first Ohio Volunteer Infantry from September 1, 1861, to January 1, 1863.
He became lieutenant colonel of the First Alabama Union Cavalry October 18, 1863.

Law degree
At the close of the war was given his degree from Miami University.
He studied law at Cincinnati Law School.
He was admitted to the bar in 1866 and commenced practice in Cincinnati.

Political career
He served as member of the Ohio House of Representatives in 1870 and 1871.

Congress
Dodds was elected as a Democrat to the Forty-second Congress to fill the vacancy caused by the resignation of Aaron F. Perry and served from October 8, 1872, to March 3, 1873.
He was not a candidate for renomination in 1872.

Later career and death
He resumed the practice of law at Cincinnati.

He died in Columbus, Ohio, April 18, 1882.
He was interred in Spring Grove Cemetery, Cincinnati, Ohio.

Legacy
Dodds Hall is a residence hall on the Miami University campus named in his memory.

External links

References 

1840 births
1882 deaths
Politicians from Cincinnati
Miami University alumni
Ohio lawyers
Democratic Party members of the United States House of Representatives from Ohio
Burials at Spring Grove Cemetery
Democratic Party members of the Ohio House of Representatives
University of Cincinnati College of Law alumni
Union Army officers
19th-century American politicians
19th-century American lawyers